Half-Life is a series of first-person shooter (FPS) games developed and published by Valve. The games combine shooting combat, puzzles and storytelling.

The original Half-Life, Valve's first product, was released in 1998 for Windows to critical and commercial success. Players control Gordon Freeman, a scientist who must survive an alien invasion. The innovative scripted sequences were influential on the FPS genre, and the game inspired numerous community-developed mods, including the multiplayer games Counter-Strike and Day of Defeat. Half-Life was followed by the expansions Opposing Force (1999), Blue Shift (2001) and Decay (2001), developed by Gearbox Software.

In 2004, Valve released Half-Life 2 to further success, with a new setting and characters and physics-based gameplay. It was followed by the extra level Lost Coast (2005) and the episodic sequels Episode One (2006) and Episode Two (2007). The first game in the Portal series, set in the same universe as Half-Life, was released in 2007.

Over the following decade, numerous Half-Life games were canceled, including Episode Three, a version of Half-Life 3, and games developed by Junction Point Studios and Arkane Studios. In 2020, after years of speculation, Valve released its flagship virtual reality game, Half-Life: Alyx. Set 5 years before Half-Life 2, players control Freeman's ally Alyx Vance in her quest to defeat the alien Combine.

Games

Half-Life

Valve's first product, Half-Life, was released on November 19, 1998, and published by Sierra On-Line for Windows. Players control Gordon Freeman, a theoretical physicist at the Black Mesa Research Facility, where an experiment accidentally causes a dimensional rift and triggers an alien invasion. Unlike many other games at the time, the player has almost uninterrupted control of Freeman, and the story is told mostly through scripted sequences. Half-Life received acclaim for its graphics, gameplay and seamless narrative. It won over 50 "Game of the Year" awards and is considered one of the most influential FPS games and one of the best video games ever made.

Opposing Force 

Half-Life was followed by an expansion pack, Opposing Force, on November 1, 1999, developed by Gearbox Software. Players control US Marine corporal Adrian Shephard, who fights a new group of aliens and black operations units.

Opposing Force was received favorably by critics, many citing the game as being as influential on setting expansion pack standards as the original game had been in influencing the overall genre. The game won the Computer Game of the Year Interactive Achievement Award of 2000 from the Academy of Interactive Arts & Sciences.

Blue Shift 

Gearbox went on to develop Blue Shift, Half-Lifes second expansion pack. Like Opposing Force, Blue Shift was published by Sierra Entertainment. Announced in 2000, the game was initially developed as a bonus campaign for the Dreamcast port of Half-Life; however, the port was cancelled and Blue Shift was instead released for Windows on June 12, 2001.

Blue Shift puts the player in the position of Barney Calhoun, a security guard working at Black Mesa. The game takes place within the early parts of Half-Life, with Calhoun attempting to escape the facility with a small group of scientists. Blue Shift also includes a High Definition pack, which upgrades the quality of the models and textures in both Blue Shift and the preceding games in the series. Critics praised the atmosphere and new graphics, but noticed the lack of new content and short length.

Decay 

The third expansion for Half-Life was Decay. The game was again developed by Gearbox and published by Sierra. However, unlike previous games, Decay is only available with the PlayStation 2 version of Half-Life. Decay is unique within the Half-Life series as the only cooperative game—two players must work together to progress through the game. Decay focuses on two of Freeman's colleagues, Gina Cross and Colette Green, as the two work with other scientists to counter the effects of the dimensional rift and ultimately attempt to close it.

Released on November 14, 2001, Decay received a weak but overall positive reception from critics, many reviewers stating that it was fun to play through with a friend, but that the game's more puzzle-oriented gameplay detracted from the overall experience. An unofficial Windows port was released in September 2008.

Half-Life 2

On November 16, 2004, Valve released Half-Life 2. The game had a six-year development cycle, which saw several delays and the leak of the game's source code. Half-Life 2 returns the player to the role of Gordon Freeman. Set twenty years after the original game, Earth has been occupied by the Combine, a transdimensional race that exploited the events of the first game to invade. The G-Man inserts Freeman into City 17 in Eastern Europe to combat the Combine occupation. Half-Life 2 garnered near-unanimous positive reviews and received critical acclaim much like its predecessor, winning over 35 Game of the Year awards for 2004. Considered one of the greatest video games of all time, the game has been critically praised for its advances in computer animation, sound, narration, computer graphics, artificial intelligence and physics. Half-Life 2 was the first game to use Valve's Steam content delivery system, a system that eventually led to Valve falling out with publisher Sierra Entertainment.

Lost Coast 

On October 27, 2005, Valve released Lost Coast, a short, playable tech demo demonstrating high-dynamic-range rendering. Consisting of a single map, Lost Coast was based on a cut segment of Half-Life 2. The player, as Freeman, climbs a cliff to destroy a Combine artillery launcher in a monastery.

Episode One

In May 2006, Valve announced a trilogy of episodic games that would continue the Half-Life 2 story, with the final episode planned for release by Christmas 2007. Newell said that the approach would allow Valve to release products more quickly after the six-year Half-Life 2 development, and that he considered the trilogy the equivalent of Half-Life 3. According to Newell, where Half-Life saw the G-Man transform Freeman into his tool, and Half-Life 2 saw Freeman being used by G-Man, the episodes would see G-Man lose control.

Episode One was released on June 1, 2006. The player controls Freeman as he and Alyx escape City 17 before a dark energy reactor core destroys it. It introduced several graphical effects, including new lighting features and more advanced facial animation. The story focuses on Alyx. Episode One received a generally positive critical reaction, although the short length was a common point of criticism.

Episode Two 

Episode Two was released for Windows, Xbox 360 and PlayStation 3 on October 10, 2007 as part of the compilation The Orange Box. It was distributed digitally on Steam and at retail by Electronic Arts. Episode Two focuses on expansive environments, travel and less linear play. As Freeman, the player travels with Alyx into the surrounding countryside, pursued by Combine forces. Episode Twos new technologies and gameplay features were praised by reviewers; however, though it was significantly longer than Episode 1, the length was again a point of criticism.

Half-Life: Alyx 

Valve released Half-Life: Alyx, a virtual reality (VR) game, on March 23, 2020, for Windows. In this prequel to Half-Life 2, players control Alyx as she and her father Eli establish the resistance against the Combine in City 17. Described by Valve as its "flagship" VR game, it was developed using the Source 2 engine and supports all PC-compatible VR headsets. Players use VR to interact with the environment and fight enemies, using gravity gloves to manipulate objects, similarly to the gravity gun from Half-Life 2. Alyx was released to acclaim. Reviewers at publications such as VG247, Tom's Hardware and Video Games Chronicle described it as VR's "killer app".

Unreleased games

Several Half-Life games have been canceled, including Half-Life 2: Episode Three, a version of Half-Life 3, and games developed by Junction Point Studios and Arkane Studios.

Related games

Portal series

The Portal series, which takes place in the same universe as the Half-Life games, is a series of puzzle games developed by Valve. The first game in the series, Portal, was initially released alongside Episode Two in The Orange Box on October 10, 2007. The player controls a test subject named Chell as she moves through the laboratories of Black Mesa's primary rival, Aperture Science, completing various tests with a device that allows her to create linked portals in physical space. In the later stages of the game, the player battles GLaDOS, a corrupt artificial intelligence computer that monitors her every move. The game is the spiritual successor to Narbacular Drop, with many of the same team members working on the game. Portal has been acclaimed as one of the most original games in 2007, receiving praise for its unique gameplay and darkly humorous story. An Xbox Live Arcade expansion was released on October 22, 2008, and its sequel, Portal 2, was released on April 19, 2011.

Counter-Strike series

In April 2000, Valve acquired the rights to the fan-made modification Counter-Strike. After some cooperation between the original team and Valve's developers, Valve sold the game in retail, retitled Half-Life: Counter-Strike. Set in various locations around the world with little connection to the events of the main Half-Life story, the game is a multiplayer shooter in which players assume the roles of members of combating teams of the governmental counter-terrorist forces and various terrorist militants opposing them. Due to originally being a mod of Half-Life, the game shared several assets with the 1998 game, including Black Mesa containers, vehicles and scientists, with the Black Mesa logos visible in several maps in the retail version implicitly setting them in the same universe. It was bundled with Half-Life in many subsequent packages, including Half-Life: Platinum Pack and Half-Life: Platinum.

When Half-Life: Counter-Strike was remade as Counter-Strike: Source, it was bundled in all retail versions of Half-Life 2, as well as all of the initial digital versions. Some game journalists referred to it as "Half-Life 2'''s multiplayer version." Both the standard retail edition and the Bronze digital edition of Half-Life 2 came with Counter-Strike: Source, while the retail Collector's Edition and the digital Gold edition also included Day of Defeat: Source and Half-Life: Source. Half-Life: Counter-Strike spawned its own series which gradually became separate from the main Half-Life games, bar occasional references (such as an Easter egg referencing Portal present in Counter-Strike: Global Offensive).

 Black Mesa Black Mesa is a third-party remake of the original Half-Life developed and published by Crowbar Collective and made in the Source engine. Originally published as a free mod in September 2012, it was approved by Valve for a commercial release. It was fully released on March 6, 2020 for Windows and Linux.

The remake's final release was praised by reviewers, who compared it to an official Valve title. On review aggregator OpenCritic, Black Mesa had an average 86/100 review score with 100% approval rating based on 14 reviews.

Third-party games

The success of the Half-Life series has spurred the creation of several spin-off games for Half-Life 2. Codename Gordon (sometimes called Codename: Gordon) is a two-dimensional Flash sidescroller shooter developed by NuclearVision, and was released over Valve's Steam online delivery system on May 18, 2004, as a promotional game for the then-upcoming Half-Life 2.

Characters from Half-Life have appeared in other games. Peggle Extreme, a special edition of Peggle bundled with the PC version of The Orange Box features levels based on Half-Life 2, Team Fortress 2 and Portal. The headcrab is also an unlockable character in Super Meat Boy when bought on Steam. The Headcrab also appeared in an April Fools event in the MMO Vindictus as an event item along with the Crowbar, possibly due to the game being created on the Source Engine as well. In the game Magicka there is a playable character (after the addition of a DLC), which closely resembles the original zombie from the Half-Life universe, equipped with a crowbar. Gordon also appears in Renegade Ops and the headcrab is available as a pet in Torchlight 2.Half-Life has also inspired a number of fan-made mods, some which have gained recognition on their own. Garry's Mod started as a sandbox mode using Half-Life 2 assets but since has become a commercial product and given users the ability to incorporate other assets. Among notable fan-made campaigns is Minerva, which was designed to extend the story from Half-Life 2.

Characters
Throughout the Half-Life franchise, a wide array of characters are introduced. The original Half-Life introduces Gordon Freeman, a theoretical physicist working at the Black Mesa Research Facility who serves as the main silent playable protagonist for the franchise. Freeman is hired and put into stasis by the G-Man, an enigmatic and questionable businessman with capabilities and powers beyond any ordinary human being. The expansion packs to the original game introduce other protagonists and characters, such as Corporal Adrian Shephard in Half-Life: Opposing Force and Black Mesa security guard Barney Calhoun in Half-Life: Blue Shift (who later reappears in the Half-Life 2 games). Half-Life 2 and the games following it introduce a new, more focused cast of characters fighting the oppressive Combine Empire. This notably includes Alyx Vance, a prominent member of the Resistance and the daughter of former Black Mesa scientist Eli Vance. Alyx would later serve as the protagonist of Half-Life: Alyx.Development

The developer of the Half-Life series, Valve, was founded in 1996 in Kirkland, Washington by former Microsoft employees Mike Harrington and Gabe Newell. Valve began working on the first Half-Life soon after formation, and settled on a concept for a horror-themed 3D action game, using the Quake engine as licensed by id Software. The game was a hit at the 1997 E3 convention, where its animation system and artificial intelligence were demonstrated. The game's success led to its first expansion pack, Half-Life: Opposing Force, which was developed by Gearbox Software, a then-new company based in Plano, Texas, and announced on April 15, 1999. Gearbox founder Randy Pitchford said in an interview that he believed Valve gave them the opportunity to produce a sequel to Half-Life to allow Valve to focus on future games. The game was demonstrated at the 1999 E3 convention, where new locations, characters and the story were revealed.

The second Half-Life expansion pack, Half-Life: Blue Shift, was again developed by Gearbox Software and announced by its publisher, Sierra Entertainment, on August 30, 2000. Sierra intended to release Blue Shift for the Dreamcast, and it was set to include higher detail models and textures that were double the polygon count of the models from Half-Life. However, after several months of delays, Sierra terminated development on the Dreamcast version of Blue Shift on June 16, 2001, and the company instead released Blue Shift for the PC on June 12, 2001. Afterward, Gearbox began working on a Half-Life game for the PlayStation 2. The game, Decay, was showcased at E3 2001, where Gearbox demonstrated the game's use of new model sets, which were around twice as detailed as those in Blue Shift.

For several years, Valve secretly worked on Half-Life 2. Valve developed a new game engine, Source, which handles the game's visual, audio and artificial intelligence elements. The Source engine comes packaged with a heavily modified version of the Havok physics engine that allows for an extra dimension of interactivity in both single-player and online environments. In the episodic games that followed Half-Life 2, Valve made minor tweaks to the game's engine. In Episode One, Valve modified Alyx's AI to allow her to react to player actions. The game runs on an upgraded version of Valve's proprietary Source engine, and features both the engine's advanced lighting effects, and a new version of its facial animation/expression technology.

In the 2010s, Valve made several attempts to develop further Half-Life games, but could not settle on a direction, and its flat management structure made it difficult for projects to gather momentum. Designer Robin Walker said Valve used Half-Life games to "solve some interesting collision of technology and art that had reared itself"; they failed to find a unifying idea that provided a sense of "wonderment, or opening, or expansion". In the mid-2010s, Valve began experimenting with virtual reality (VR); they built prototypes using their various intellectual properties such as Portal, and found that Half-Life best suited VR. Their flagship VR game, Half-Life: Alyx, entered production using Valve's new Source 2 engine in 2016, with the largest team in Valve's history, including members of Campo Santo, a studio Valve acquired in 2018.

 Film 
On February 6, 2013, while speaking at the 2013 DICE conference about storytelling in games and film, J. J. Abrams and Gabe Newell announced that they had plans for a game and a film collaboration. Abrams said, "There's an idea we have for a game that we'd like to work with Valve on," while Newell said, "We're going to figure out if we can make a Portal movie or Half-Life movie together". In an interview in March 2016, Abrams stated that while he has been working on many other projects since, he still has plans to direct these films in the future, with both films in the writing stage.

Half-Life: Uplink
A short film, Half-Life: Uplink, was developed by Cruise Control, a British marketing agency, and released on March 15, 1999. However, Sierra withdrew it from circulation after Sierra and Valve had failed to resolve licensing issues with Cruise Control over the film. The critical reception of the film was very poor. The film's plot was that of a journalist attempting to infiltrate the Black Mesa Research Facility and discover what was happening there.

Half-Life: Escape from City 17

In early 2009, the Purchase Brothers, a Toronto-based film company, released a five-minute film based on Half-Life 2: Episode One, Half-Life: Escape from City 17. The film combines live-action footage with 3D animation created using the Source SDK. It was well received by Valve. On August 25, 2010 they released a nearly 15-minute-long sequel.

Beyond Black Mesa

In late 2010, a trailer for a Half-Life inspired independent short film, Beyond Black Mesa, was released. Directed by Brian Curtin, it follows the character Adrian Shephard. The full short film was released online on January 21, 2011.

Sales

In December 2008, Valve announced that the two main Half-Life games had sold 15.8 million units in retail (9.3m for the first, 6.5m for the second), while the Half-Life expansions had sold 1.9 million (Opposing Force: 1.1 million, Blue Shift: 800,000) and Half-Life 2 expansions 1.4 million (all for Episode One). 

Additionally, The Orange Box, which included Half-Life 2 and both of its episodic expansions, sold 3 million units at retail by that time. This put franchise sales at 18.8 million full games (Half-Life: 9.3m, Half-Life 2: 9.5m) and 9.3 million expansions (Opposing Force: 1.1m, Blue Shift: 0.8m, Episode One: 4.4m, Episode 2: 3.0m), as of December 2008. 

These figures did not account for digital sales. Half-Life: Counter-Strike sold 4.2 million units standalone by the same time, while its remake, Counter-Strike: Source was bundled with every sold retail copy of Half-Life 2. Forbes reported that, including digital sales, Half-Life 2'' had sold over 12 million copies by February 2011.

References

External links
 
 
 Combine OverWiki, an external Wiki

 
Valve Corporation franchises
Valve Corporation games
Apocalyptic video games
Video game franchises introduced in 1998